Izmail (translit. Izmail, formerly Тучков ("Tuchkov");  or Smil;) is a city and municipality on the Danube river in Odesa Oblast in south-western Ukraine. It serves as the administrative center of Izmail Raion, one of seven districts of Odesa Oblast, and is the only locality which constitutes Izmail urban hromada, one of the hromadas of Ukraine. 

In Russian historiography, Izmail is associated with the 18th century sacking of Ottoman fortress of Izmail by Russian general Alexander Suvorov. It was the capital of Izmail Oblast, but it is no longer, as Izmail Oblast joined Odesa Oblast in 1954.

It is the largest Ukrainian port in the Danube Delta, on its Chilia branch. As such, Izmail is a center of the food processing industry and a popular regional tourist destination. It is also a base of the Ukrainian Navy and the Ukrainian Sea Guard units operating on the river. The World Wildlife Fund's Isles of Izmail Regional Landscape Park is located nearby. Population:

History 
It belonged for a short period of time to Wallachia (14th century) – as the territory north of the Danube was one of the possessions of the Basarabs (later the land being named after them, Bessarabia). The town was first mentioned with the name Ismailiye, derived from the name of the Ottoman Grand Vizier Izmail.

From the end of the 14th century, Izmail was under the rule of Moldavia. In 1484, the Ottoman state conquered the territory, which became from that moment an Ottoman protectorate (under direct rule from 1538). Since the early 16th century it was the main Ottoman fortress in the Budjak region. In 1569 Sultan Selim II settled Izmail with his Nogai subjects, originally from the North Caucasus.

After Russian general Nicholas Repnin took the fortress of Izmail in 1770, it was heavily refortified by the Turks, so as never to be captured again. The Sultan boasted that the fortress was impregnable, but during the Russo-Turkish War of 1787–1792 the Russian Army commander Alexander Suvorov successfully stormed it on 22 December 1790. Ottoman forces inside the fortress had the orders to stand their ground to the end, haughtily declining the Russian ultimatum. The defeat was seen as a catastrophe in the Ottoman Empire, while in Russia it was glorified in the country's first national anthem, Let the thunder of victory sound!.

Suvorov announced the capture of Ismail in 1791 to the Empress Catherine in a doggerel couplet, after the assault had been pressed from house to house, room to room, most of the garrison and support forces in the city had been killed in three days, a few hundred taken into captivity. For all his bluffness, Suvorov later told an English traveler that when all was over he went back to his tent and wept.

At the end of the war, Izmail was returned to the Ottoman Empire, but Russian forces took it for the third time on 14 September 1809. After it was ceded to Russia with the rest of Bessarabia by the 1812 Treaty of Bucharest, the town was rebuilt thoroughly. The Intercession Cathedral (1822–36), the churches of Nativity (1823), St. Nicholas (1833) and several others date back to that time. Izmail's oldest building is the small Turkish mosque, erected either in the 15th or 16th centuries, converted into a church in 1810 and currently housing a museum dedicated to the 1790 storm of Izmail.

 
 

After Russia lost the Crimean War, the town returned to the Principality of Moldavia, which would soon become part of the Romanian Principalities. Russia gained control of Izmail again after the Russo-Turkish War of 1877–1878. With the breakup of the Russian Empire in 1917 and in the aftermath of World War I, the city was occupied by the Romanian Army on 22 January 1918, after a skirmish with troops of the Danube flotilla. Later that year, the Sfatul Țării of Chișinău, which claimed to be the representative of the whole of Bessarabia, voted to formally unite the region with Romania. This union was recognized by the United Kingdom, France and Italy in the Treaty of Paris, but not by the Soviet Union which had territorial claims over Bessarabia.

In 1940, and again during World War II, it was occupied by the Soviet Red Army and included (August 1940) in the Ukrainian SSR; the region was occupied in 1941–1944 by the Romanian Army participating in Operation Barbarossa. During the Soviet period following World War II, many Russians and Ukrainians migrated to the town, gradually changing its ethnic composition. Izmail Oblast was formed in 1940 and the town remained its administrative center until the oblast was merged to Odesa Oblast in 1954. Since 24 August 1991, Izmail has been part of independent Ukraine.

Until 18 July 2020, Izmail was incorporated as a city of oblast significance and served as the administrative center of Izmail Raion though it did not belong to the raion. In July 2020, as part of the administrative reform of Ukraine, which reduced the number of raions of Odesa Oblast to seven, the city of Izmail was merged into Izmail Raion.

The monument to Alexander Suvorov in Izmail's city centre was placed in temporary storage on 12 November 2022, until city deputies decide where it will be kept permanently.

Geography

Climate 
Under the Köppen climate classification, Izmail falls within either a hot-summer humid continental climate (Dfa) if the  isotherm is used or a humid subtropical climate (Cfa) if the  isotherm is used. Izmail experiences four distinct seasons and generous precipitation year-round, typical for the inland South. Summers are hot and humid, with temperatures somewhat moderated by the city's elevation. Winters are cool but variable, with an average of 48 freezing days per year.

Demographics 

Before 1920, the population of Izmail was estimated at 37,000. During that time, approximately 11,000 of the population were Jewish, 8,000 Romanians and 6,000 Germans. Additional members of the population were Russians, Bulgarians, Turks and Cossacks.
 2008 — 77,076
 2011 — 75,581

The national composition (2001): Russians - 43.7% (33,600), Ukrainians - 38.0% (29,200), Bulgarians - 10.0% (7,700) and Romanians - 4.3% (3,300). In 2010, the population was 75,300. The population also consists of many other nationalities: Gagauz, Greeks, Jews, Armenians, etc. - 75 nationalities.

Notable residents 
Alexandru Averescu, Romanian Marshal, Army Commander during World War I; Prime Minister (in fact, born near Izmail, in the village of Ozerne)
Ioan Chirilă, Romanian writer and sports journalist
Galina Chistyakova, Soviet, Russian, and later Slovakian athlete, winner of the long jump bronze medal at the 1988 Summer Olympics
Leonid Dimov, Romanian poet (1926, Ismail – 1987, Bucharest)
Olena Hovorova, Ukrainian athlete, winner of the triple jump bronze medal at the 2000 Summer Olympics
Wiktor Kemula, Polish chemist, electrochemist, and polarographist, developer of the hanging mercury drop electrode (HMDE)
Vitali Konstantinov, Russian wrestler
Ruslan Maynov, Bulgarian actor and musician
Gavril Musicescu, Romanian composer
Sergiu Sarchizov, Romanian composer and conductor
Sholom Schwartzbard, Jewish anarchist, assassin of Symon Petliura
Ivan Shishman, Bulgarian artist
Tsarev, Vadim Yuryevich – Russian philosopher, publicist, author of television films, Member of the Union of writers of Russia
Artur Văitoianu, Romanian general, Army commander during World War I; Prime Minister

Gallery

Notes

External links 

 
Cities in Odesa Oblast
Castles in Moldavia
Danube Delta
Populated places on the Danube
Port cities and towns in Ukraine
Port cities of the Black Sea
Cities of regional significance in Ukraine
Izmailsky Uyezd
Ismail County
Capitals of the counties of Bessarabia
Cities in Izmail Raion
Hromadas of Odesa Oblast